The Jochen Rindt Gedächtnisrennen or the VI Rhein-Pokalrennen was a motor race, run to Formula One rules, held on 13 June 1971 at the Hockenheimring, Germany. The race was run over 35 laps of the circuit, and was dominated by Belgian driver Jacky Ickx in a Ferrari 312B.

The race was arranged after the Belgian Grand Prix of 1971 was cancelled, in order to fill the gap between the Monaco Grand Prix and the Dutch Grand Prix. The German Grand Prix had moved to the Nürburgring, so the Hockenheim circuit was chosen for the race, which was also a memorial race for Jochen Rindt, the reigning World Champion who had been killed at the 1970 Italian Grand Prix.

On the same weekend, the 1971 24 Hours of Le Mans was being held, so several of the regular Formula One drivers were absent from this race, including Chris Amon, Jean-Pierre Beltoise, Henri Pescarolo, Pedro Rodríguez and Jo Siffert. There were other absentees: Jackie Stewart and Denny Hulme were taking part in the Labatt's 200 Can-Am race, and Emerson Fittipaldi was recovering from a road accident. Of the regular Formula One teams, Matra were at Le Mans, Brabham were still repairing Graham Hill's car after an accident in Monaco, and Tyrrell elected not to take part. Scuderia Ferrari had entered a car for Mario Andretti but he missed the race after suffering burns in an accident in the US.

As a tribute to Rindt, pole position on the grid was left vacant, leaving polesitter Ickx alone on the front row, taking the second slot.

Qualifying
The practice sessions were dominated by the Ferraris, with Ickx lapping comfortably faster than he had done on his last visit to the circuit, for the 1970 German Grand Prix. The gas turbine Lotus 56B of Dave Walker suffered an engine fire during practice, and Walker took over Tony Trimmer's car for the race. Robert Lamplough and Bernd Terbeck were driving old BRMs recently bought from the factory, and although Lamplough qualified his P133 relatively well, Terbeck's even older P126 blew its engine and he was unable to start the race.

Race
Ickx started well and pulled away from team-mate Clay Regazzoni in second, with Ronnie Peterson following behind. Ickx stayed in front for the whole race, although Regazzoni stopped after three laps with a mechanical fault which ultimately cost him ten laps after a mechanic had to go out to fix it.

As the race continued, Reine Wisell passed Peterson and was catching Ickx when he pitted with brake problems. Wisell lost two laps while his brakes were bled. Peterson himself encountered a clutch fault and began to fall further behind Ickx. Peter Gethin retired on lap four with a broken throttle, and John Miles had to retire three laps later with an engine fault. Ray Allen dropped out at the back of the field with a fuel leak on lap 15.

By this time, John Surtees had passed Howden Ganley for third, with Nanni Galli's ailing March in fifth. Rolf Stommelen missed a chicane while racing with Walker and Skip Barber, and the German was later given a one-minute penalty for this transgression. At the chequered flag, Ickx finished almost a minute ahead of Peterson, with Surtees over 20 seconds behind the Swede.

Results

Stommelen finished sixth on the track, but was penalised one minute for missing the chicane, demoting him to seventh.

References

Race results at www.silhouet.com 

Jochen Rindt Gedachtnisrennen
Jochen Rindt
Jochen Rindt Gedachtnisrennen